is a former Japanese football player. He currently manager of Chugoku Soccer League club, Fukuyama City FC.

Club career
Ueno was born in Koka on August 26, 1965. After graduating from Waseda University, he joined All Nippon Airways in 1988. Although he debuted in February 1990, he could not play many matches. In 1991, he moved to Mazda (later Sanfrecce Hiroshima). He played many matches as center back and defensive midfielder. However he could not play at all in the match from 1993 and he retired end of 1994 season.

International career
In 1988, Ueno was selected Japan national "B team" for 1988 Asian Cup. But he did not play in the match.

Managerial career
After retirement, Ueno started coaching career at Sanfrecce Hiroshima in 1995. He mainly served as coach for top team and manager for youth team until 2003. In 2004, he became a manager for Japan U-20 national team. In 2005, he signed with Kyoto Purple Sanga (later Kyoto Sanga FC) and served mainly coach for top team until 2008. In 2009, he moved to Regional Leagues club Zweigen Kanazawa. The club was promoted to Japan Football League (JFL) in 2010. he managed the club until 2011. In 2012, he signed with Albirex Niigata and managed youth team until 2013. In May 2012, top team manager Hisashi Kurosaki was sacked and Ueno managed top team as caretaker until June when the club signed with new manager Masaaki Yanagishita.

In 2014, he signed with JFL club Renofa Yamaguchi FC. In 2014, the club won the 4th place and was promoted to J3 League. In 2015, the club won the champions and was promoted to J2 League. However, as the club produced underwhelming performances throughout his time in charge of the club at the 2017 season, he was sacked in May, when the club was the antepenultimate-placed team at the J3.

In May 2018, he signed with J2 club Ventforet Kofu. He resigned at the end of 2018 season.

In July 2021, Ueno was appointed as manager of Kagoshima United FC mid-season. On 4 December of the same year, he left the club after half a season with Kagoshima.

On 5 January 2023, Ueno was appointed as the new Fukuyama City FC manager for the upcoming 2023 season.

Career statistics

Club
.

Managerial statistics
.

References

External links
 
 

1965 births
Living people
Waseda University alumni
Association football people from Shiga Prefecture
Japanese footballers
Japan Soccer League players
J1 League players
Yokohama Flügels players
Sanfrecce Hiroshima players
Japanese football managers
J1 League managers
J2 League managers
J3 League managers
Zweigen Kanazawa managers
Albirex Niigata managers
Renofa Yamaguchi FC managers
Ventforet Kofu managers
Kagoshima United FC managers
Association football defenders